is a Prefectural Natural Park in Ehime Prefecture, Japan. Established in 1965, the park spans the borders of the municipalities of Ikata, Seiyo, and Yawatahama.

See also
 National Parks of Japan
 Ashizuri-Uwakai National Park

References

External links
  Detailed map of Sadamisaki Hantō-Uwakai Prefectural Natural Park (west)
  Detailed map of Sadamisaki Hantō-Uwakai Prefectural Natural Park (east)

Parks and gardens in Ehime Prefecture
Ikata, Ehime
Seiyo, Ehime
Yawatahama, Ehime
Protected areas established in 1965
1965 establishments in Japan